Tasha Spillett-Sumner (née Spillett) is a Canadian author and educator. She is best known for her young adult graphic novel series Surviving the City, volume 1 of which won the Best Work in an Alternative Format at the 2019 Indigenous Voices Awards.

Career 
Spillett-Sumner competed in the 2014 Miss Indian World pageant. She was chosen as Miss Congeniality. Spillett-Sumner was a board member of Manito Ahbee and served as the chair of the Miss Manito Ahbee Youth Ambassador gathering, which honoured of missing and murdered indigenous women and girls. Spillett-Sumner also mentored young Indigenous people in Winnipeg through Sister Circle. Spillett-Sumner has taught both high school social studies and English in addition to land-based knowledge workshops and programs.

In 2018, Spillett-Sumner's debut graphic novel, Surviving the City, vol. 1, was published by Highwater Press. The book was illustrated by Natasha Donovan and depicts two young Indigenous women, Miikwan, who is Anishinaabe, and Dez, who is Inninew. The second volume of Surviving the City, "From the Roots Up" was released in October 2020.

In April 2021, Spillett-Sumner released the picture book I Sang You Down from the Stars, illustrated by Michaela Goade. I Sang You Down from the Stars debuted at number 3 on the New York Times Best Seller List and remained there for a week. Spillett-Sumner began writing the book while pregnant with her daughter, Isabella.

Works 

 Surviving the City
 Volume 1: "Surviving the City" - illustrated by Natasha Donovan (2018), as Tasha Spillett
 Volume 2: "From the Roots Up" - illustrated by Natasha Donovan (2020)
I Sang You Down from the Stars - illustrated by Michaela Goade (2021)
Beautiful You, Beautiful Me - illustrated by Salini Perera (2022)

Awards 
In 2019, "Surviving the City" was awarded Best Work in an Alternative Format at the Indigenous Voices Awards. At the American Library Association's 2020 Youth Media Awards, Spillett-Sumner's "Surviving the City" was awarded a Young Adult Book Honor. I Sang You Down from the Stars was award the McNally Robinson Book for Young People award at the 2022 Manitoba Book Awards.

Personal life 
Spillett-Sumner is of Nehiyaw and Trinidadian descent. She has a master's degree in land-based Indigenous education from the University of Saskatchewan. Spillett also is completing her PhD in education there. She received the Queen Elizabeth II Centennial Aboriginal Scholarship to pursue her PhD.

Spillett-Sumner is married to singer-songwriter Leonard Sumner. She gave birth to their daughter, Isabella, in March 2020.

References 

First Nations women writers
University of Saskatchewan alumni
Living people
Year of birth missing (living people)
21st-century Canadian women writers
Women writers of young adult literature
Canadian graphic novelists
Canadian people of Cree descent
Canadian people of Trinidad and Tobago descent
21st-century First Nations writers